"We'll Be Together" is the 39th single by Japanese singer/songwriter Yōko Oginome. Written by Oginome and Steve Barakatt, the single was released on June 23, 1999, by Victor Entertainment.

Background and release
The song was used as the ending theme song of the 1999 season of the NTV cultural documentary series . The B-side, "Taiyō no Kisetsu", was used by Japan Post for its commercials. Both songs were co-written by Oginome, which was a first in her singles discography.

"We'll be Together" peaked at No. 83 on Oricon's singles chart and sold over 3,000 copies, becoming Oginome's last new single to appear on any singles charts.

Track listing

Charts

References

External links

1999 singles
Yōko Oginome songs
Japanese-language songs
Victor Entertainment singles